Auguste Paul Almire Giroux (29 July 1874 in Châteauneuf-sur-Loire, Loiret – 9 August 1953 in Portel-des-Corbières, Aude) was a French rugby union player who competed in the 1900 Summer Olympics. He was a member of the French rugby union team, which won the gold medal.

References

External links

profile

1874 births
1953 deaths
French rugby union players
Rugby union players at the 1900 Summer Olympics
Olympic rugby union players of France
Olympic gold medalists for France
Medalists at the 1900 Summer Olympics
Sportspeople from Loiret